The Confederation of Revolutionary Anarcho-Syndicalists (CRAS-IWA or KRAS-MAT; ; Konfederatsiya revolyutsionnykh anarkho-sindikalistov, KRAS-MAT) is the Russian section of the International Workers' Association (AIT). CRAS-IWA is committed to the development of anarchist trade union movement, so as to enable the transition from modern capitalism to statefree communism.

History 
Confederation of revolutionary anarcho-syndicalists was established at the founding congress of 5 August 1995, held in Moscow. It was formed in result of long search for ways to develop the anarchist movement in Russia at the turn of the 1980s in the former Soviet Union.  In 1989–1991, the anarchist movement developed in the frames of Confederation of Anarcho-Syndicalists. CRAS-IWA view KAS as a reformist, anti-communist and pro-market organization. 

The ideological bases of KAS were not accepted by all of his participants, and this situation led in 1990 to a split of Assotiation of anarchist movements (ADA) from KAS. 5 March 1991,  Initiative of revolutionary anarchists (IREAN) was also established. It was the first attempt to  create an anarcho-communist counterweight to pro-market KAS. Subsequently, Confederation revolutionary anarcho-syndicalists arose as a continuation of IREAN.

On the Constitutive Congress of CRAS-IWA, several resolutions were adopted: «On the situation in Eastern Europe and Northern Asia, and our problems», «On the resistance to militarism», «On the resistance to the fascist threat», «On the relation to other libertarian groups» and a number of others.

At the second Congress of CRAS in Gomel (Republic of Belarus), 24–25 August 1996, the earlier-made intention to join the International Workers' Association was confirmed. The  delegates at the Congress of IWA of December 1996 were elected. This IWA Congress adopted CRAS as a section of anarcho-syndicalist International. Joining the IWA was ratified at the third Congress of CRAS-IWA 29 August 1997, held in Lviv (Ukraine).

The organization publishes a paper and a theoretical journal, distributes leaflets and stickers, occasionally publishes pamphlets and makes graffiti campaigns.

The activists of the Moscow organization of CRAS-IWA provided active support and technical assistance to some strike movements: from these of teachers in Moscow region (1995), of workers at the plant «Rostselmash» (Rostov-on-Don), at machine-building plant in Yasnogorsk (1999) (the strike was led by general assemblies of workers), of  building workers in Moscow (1999) and up to these of "Ford" motor-car workers (2007) and of shop-assistants of "Detsky Mir" store in Moscow`s suburb Khimki (2009). Aiding to these strikes, the CRAS-IWA members tried to convey to the workers anarcho-syndicalist ideas and tactics.

The members of CRAS-IWA develop big activity distributing the antimilitarist propaganda. They participated in the actions against the First and Second Chechen Wars, the war in South Ossetia (August 2008) and in other anti-war actions.

In Baikalsk, members of CRAS-IWA were initiators of an inter-profession workers union which was subsequently destroyed by repressions to the End of the 1990s. 
 
The members of CRAS-IWA are actively involved in demonstrations, pickets and other protest actions, promoting experiences, methods and ideas of anarcho-syndicalism. Since late 2008, activists of CRAS-IWA organize actions against growth of prices.

As a result of general decline of social movements, only the Moscow general unions organization remained in the CRAS-IWA by the end of 2007. In the June 2008, also the Federation of workers in education, science and technics (FRONT) was found. Some internal problems emerging in 2000s culminated in September 2008 when a little group was excluded from CRAS-IWA during a general members referendum for advocating of antisyndicalist and national-anarchist ("ethno-anarchist") ideas.

In the meantime a way out of problems was marked, new people and also new friends of CRAS-IWA outside Moscow region emerged. Now, there are two little union initiatives in CRAS-IWA: FRONT и and new Inter-branch (general) workers union (MOST) organized by ex-MPST members remaining in the CRAS-IWA and by new members. Both are autonomous in the frame of organizational and ideal principles of CRAS and of IWA.

Ideal base of the Confederation of revolutionary anarcho-syndicalists

Members of CRAS-IWA can't be persons exploiting the hired labor and members of political parties. There are no chiefs and paid functionaries in the organization.

.

CRAS-IWA rejects participation in blocs and coalitions with any political party, but it is ready to cooperate (and it cooperates to the extent possible) with various civic, social, professional, environmental, and similar initiatives and associations, which seek to protect the social economic and human interests of workers.

It is about interaction in direct protest actions, whose objectives do not contradict the ideal lines of CRAS-IWA.

Publications 
Confederation of revolutionary anarcho-syndicalists publishes paper "Pryamoye Deystviye" ("Direct Action") (since 1994, some time in the past in the form of a theoretical review) and the magazine "Libertarnaya Mysl" ("Libertarian thought") (from the end of 2008). In addition, during a few years after 1998, bulletin «The new workers movement» was published.

Also a series of booklets was issued by CRAS-IWA ("Positive program of anarchists" of G. Hadjiev, «What is anarcho-syndicalism?» and some others).

The paper Chornaya Zvezda (Black Star) published by CRAS-IWA in 2003–2008, is now in the hands of splinter group MPST and has no relation with CRAS after 2008.

References

Some references in the media and the press (in Russian)
In the media: 
 В Москве появились граффити против повышения цен на проезд: 5.01.2009 In Moscow, graffiti against the rising of transport prices: 5.01.2009 
 Зайцы, клоуны и деды морозы — против повышения цен Rabbits, clowns and Santa Clauses - against rising prices 
 Клоуны призывают помочь московским чиновникам жить еще лучше Clowns called on Moscow to help officials live even better 
 Не забудем! — шествие памяти Маркелова и Бабуровой 20.01.2009 Do not forget - the march of memory of Markelov and Baburova 20.01.2009 
 Рублев Д. Российские анархисты. Сегодня, здесь, сейчас Rublyov D. Russian anarchists. Today, here, now 
 Троцкист — это не ругательство Trotskyites - it does not foul 
 Чертановская милиция против «Неволи» Police of Chertanovo against «Nevolya»

In books: 
 Бученков Д. Е. Анархисты в России в конце XX века. — М.: Книжный дом «ЛИБРОКОМ», 2009. - Buchenkov D. Anarchists in Russia at the end of 20th century. - M.: Book house «LIBROKOM», 2009. 
 Тарасов А. Н., Черкасов Г. Ю., Шавшукова Т. В. Левые в России: от умеренных до экстремистов. — М.: Институт экспериментальной социологии, 1997 г.  Tarasov AN, Cherkasov G. Yu, T. Shavshukova left in Russia: from moderate to extremist. - M.: Institute for Experimental Sociology, 1997   
 Тарасов А. Н. Революция не всерьез. Штудии по теории и истории квазиреволюционных движений. — М.: Ультра. Культура, 2005 г.  - Tarasov A.N. revolution not seriously. Study on the theory and history of quasi-revolutionary movements. - M.: Ultra. Culture, 2005,

External links

See also
Anarchism in Russia

1995 establishments in Russia
Anarchist organizations in Russia
Anarcho-syndicalism
Communist organizations in Russia
Far-left politics in Russia
International Workers' Association
National trade union centers of Russia
Organizations established in 1995
Russian democracy movements
Syndicalist trade unions